Anna Kay Napualani Akana (born August 18, 1989) is an American actress, filmmaker, musician, and YouTuber. She has appeared in TV series, films, and music videos that include Awkward (2011), Ant-Man (2015), Hello, My Name is Doris (2016), and Dirty (2020).

In 2015, she launched a clothing line Ghost & Stars. She is the author of So Much I Want to Tell You: Letters to My Little Sister (2017), in which she describes her struggles and experiences.

Early and personal life
Akana's father was an officer in the United States Marine Corps, including during her childhood. Her father moved every few years to a new state or country. In a 2020 interview, she said that she loved Sailor Moon, Inuyasha and Ranma ½, expressing her surprise that her dad would make them watch Tenchi Muyo! with him because of its "perverted" nature. Her father stated that he loved shows like The Powerpuff Girls, animation in general, and anime, the latter especially because he spent "four years growing up in Japan".

On February 14, 2007, Akana's younger sister, Kristina, died by suicide aged 13. Several months after, Akana watched Margaret Cho perform on a Comedy Central special and laughed for the first time since her sister's death. She began to see laughter as a means of trying to move on with her life and decided to seriously pursue comedy. Akana has been vocal about her sister's suicide and is a strong advocate for suicide prevention. In 2013, Akana uploaded a YouTube video, "please don't kill yourself", in which she explains how it felt for her to have a family member die by suicide. In that same year, she released a book Surviving Suicide which contains her journal entries from the two years after her sister's death.

In October 2018, she came out as bisexual.
In 2019, she stated in a post to her Instagram that she had undergone an abortion when she was 20 and felt it was one of the best decisions she'd ever made. She mentioned this fact in one of her books and later created a dramatized movie uploaded on YouTube, which presented her story.
Akana is of Japanese descent from her father and Filipino descent from her mother.

Career
Akana first started performing comedy at age 19 but switched to YouTube video performances in 2011 after experiencing panic attacks and anxiety before going on stage. She later resumed performing stand-up onstage.

YouTube
In 2014, Akana formed a comedy music duo, Cat Benatar, with fellow comedian and writer Megan Rosati. (The duo's name is wordplay for the pop singer Pat Benatar.)

Akana creates both comedy and documentary YouTube videos. In 2014, Akana was listed on New Media Rockstars Top 100 Channels, ranked at #72. In that same year, Akana decided to focus more on her skills as a director and attempted to make one short film a month. While she did not reach her goal of twelve short films, she did make six short films which were received well by her YouTube audience. Akana starred in all of her short films and has starred in various other short films, and she has since continued to create short films.

One of her short films, Miss Earth, was partially financed by Brian Grazer and Ron Howard's production company, New Form Digital. It was part of the 2014 Incubator, a series to showcase and produce original stories by YouTube Creators and filmmakers. Miss Earth was later adapted into a web series, Miss 2059, and released on Verizon's go90 app in June 2016, with a second season released in late 2017.

Akana executive produced and starred as the lead role in the original comedy-drama web television series Youth & Consequences, created by Jason Ubaldi and released in March 2018 on YouTube Red. She is also the host of the web series Crash Course Business: Entrepreneurship beginning in August 2019.

On October 10, 2019 she was featured in a 30 minute YouTube documentary created by SoulPancake in collaboration with Funny or Die wherein a variety of comedians discuss mental health called Laughing Matters.

Film and television
In 2011, Akana appeared in the TV series Awkward. In that same year, she also appeared as an extra in Katy Perry's "Last Friday Night" music video.

In 2015, she appeared in the films Ant-Man and Kids vs Monsters.

Akana starred in Snapper Hero, a scripted video series distributed via Snapchat. The series was sponsored by AT&T.

In 2016, Akana appeared alongside Sally Field in the indie comedy film Hello, My Name Is Doris, written by Michael Showalter. That same year, she also appeared in a short Star Wars fan film, Hoshino as well as the comedy film Dirty 30.

She has a recurring role in the Comedy Central show Corporate.

She also has supporting roles as Gloria Sato in the Disney Channel show Big City Greens and Sasha Waybright in Amphibia.

In 2019, she announced on Ryan Higa's Off the Pill podcast to be part of the Netflix original Jupiter's Legacy.

Akana also hosts the podcast Explain Things to Me with fellow comedian Brad Gage where the two interview experts in various fields about their work.

In 2021, Akana was announced as starring alongside Emma Roberts in the romantic comedy  About Fate.

Other ventures
In 2015, Akana released a clothing line, Ghost & Stars, which features several cat-themed designs as well as formal dresses, leggings, and a variety of T-shirts.

In 2017, Akana's book So Much I Want to Tell You: Letters to My Little Sister was published. The book describes Akana's struggles and experiences growing up and offers advice to her late sister.

In 2019, Akana transitioned from comedy into music, and upon so, released her debut single, "Intervention". Its music video was directed by Auden Bui. She has since released two more music videos, one for "Pretty Girls Don't Cry" in July 2019 and "Not My Proudest Moment" in August. She continued to release music videos for songs named "Alone Together", "Disappointment" and "Let Me Go". Her debut album Casualty came out in October 2019. Her follow up project came out early 2021 called No Longer Yours.

Critical reception
In reviewing her video, "Why Guys Like Asian Girls" (which references "Yellow Fever", a term for an Asian fetish) Cate Matthews of The Huffington Post wrote: "A step-by-step takedown of 'yellow fever' or the desire to date Asian women often accompanied by bizarre, offensive attempts to do so, could start the healing. Luckily for us, YouTuber Anna Akana was more than up to the video-making task."

In reviewing her video, "How to Deal with a Breakup", MTV wrote: "In this sketch, comedian Anna Akana envisions the flurry of activity inside the cranial command center of a newly single dumpee."

Deadline referred to Akana as "a prolific online creator whose channel boasts 60 million views and 900,000 subscribers, and last year wrote and starred in her own narrative feature Riley Rewind, scoring a none-too-shabby 20M views online."

Filmography

Feature films

Television

Web series

Discography

Studio albums

Extended plays

Singles

As featuring artist

Promotional singles

Other appearances

Music videos

Guest appearances

Awards

References

External links

ghostandstars.com

1989 births
American actresses
American filmmakers
American people of English descent
American people of French descent
American people of Irish descent
American people of Spanish descent
American women podcasters
American podcasters
Bisexual actresses
Comedy YouTubers
Bisexual comedians
LGBT YouTubers
Living people
Place of birth missing (living people)
YouTube filmmakers
YouTube vloggers
Women video bloggers
YouTube channels launched in 2010
American actresses of Filipino descent
American musicians of Filipino descent
American actresses of Japanese descent
American women musicians of Japanese descent
Music YouTubers
People from Monterey County, California
American comedians of Asian descent
20th-century American LGBT people
21st-century American LGBT people
American LGBT people of Asian descent
American LGBT singers
Bisexual musicians
American bisexual actors
21st-century American women
LGBT people from California
American LGBT comedians
YouTubers from California